Hocquigny is a commune in the Manche department in north-western France. As of 2019, the population of Hocquigny was 188 people.

See also
Communes of the Manche department

References

Communes of Manche